2 Brothers on the 4th Floor is a Dutch musical group created in 1990 by brothers Martin and Bobby Boer. The group has had success in many countries including the Netherlands, Belgium, Germany, Greece, Czech Republic, Norway, Finland, South Africa, Argentina, Chile, Israel, Canada, the United States and the United Kingdom. The most recent members of 2 Brothers on the 4th Floor are Martin and Bobby Boer, Dutch singer , and rapper D-Rock.

Early career, 1990–1991
The Boer brothers had already been experimenting with music in a small bedroom when they finally gained note in 1990, when their single Can't Help Myself was picked up by Dutch radio stations and became an international hit. The brothers then brought together rapper Da Smooth Baron MC and singers Peggy "The Duchess" and Gale Robinson to form their stage act. The release of their next single, Turn Da Music Up was somewhat less successful, but helped the band to gain name recognition.

2 Brothers on the 4th Floor made two hit singles together before separating. Martin Boer moved into a new professional studio and started making remixes under the name Dancability Productions, making remixes for artists such as Becky Bell, Twenty 4 Seven and Luv' (for their Megamix '93), while Bobby Boer designed record covers and CD inlays for other artists.

1993–1994: Revival and Dreams
2 Brothers on the 4th Floor was revived by the Boer brothers in 1993. Bobby joined Martin in his studio and, after some time, released the single Never Alone. This single was the first to be launched with rapper D-Rock (René Philips) and singer Desirée Manders (stage name: Des'Ray). The song Dreams, which is the title song of the band's first album, was a song that captured the essence of Eurodance. Due to the genre's popularity when the song was released in 1994, the song became a hit both nationally and internationally. The band's renewed style and concept was accepted well by Dutch audience. Never Alone topped the charts for weeks and went gold. Dreams, the band's subsequent single, went straight to number one and remained on the charts for weeks (as well as reaching the top 30 on Billboard's Hot Dance Club Songs chart in the United States) and Let Me Be Free, its successor, remained in the top ten nationally for some time.

1995–1997: 2
In 1995 and 1996, 2 Brothers on the 4th Floor further widened their success with the singles Fly (Through the Starry Night), Come Take My Hand and Fairytales, changing their style to happy hardcore. These singles topped the charts in various European countries. At the end of 1996, the band released the single There's a Key and its second album, 2.
After 2, the band shifted styles and first recorded the single One Day, an R&B track that departed from their typical Eurodance style. Afterwards, they returned to their previous Eurodance style with the single I'm Thinkin' of U.

1998–2001: Single releases
In March 1998, 2 Brothers on the 4th Floor released the single Do U Know, a mid to low tempo pop track. At the beginning of autumn 1998, the single The Sun Will Be Shining was released. It contains remixes by Mark van Dale & Enrico, Dance Therapy and the Dub Foundation. Packaged with The Sun Will Be Shining was a CD-ROM featuring the videos of "The Sun Will Be Shining" and "The Making Of".

On 5 February 1999 the single Heaven Is Here was released. 29 October that year saw the release of the single Living In Cyberspace. On 16 June 2000 the single "Wonderful Feeling" was released. On 29 June 2001 the single "Stand Up And Live" was released.

2002–present: Hiatus and return
The duo had never released its third album due to problems with record companies. Currently, the band is touring, with performances planned for 2018. The group released "The Very Best of" in April 2016. In addition to their duties with 2 Brothers on the 4th Floor, Des'Ray has a solo career, and D-Rock is working with the rapper/MC E-Life.

Discography

Studio albums

Singles

References 

Dutch house music groups
Dutch Eurodance groups
Sibling musical duos
Dutch musical duos
Electronic dance music duos
Musical groups established in 1990
1990 establishments in the Netherlands